Ordinary Monsters is a 2022 fantasy novel by J.M. Miro, a pseudonym for Steven Price.

Background 
Ordinary Monsters is the first of a planned trilogy.

Plot 
The plot is set in the Victorian era and is about children with special abilities. The employees of a special academy called the Cairndale Institute are determined to find them, and a monster is hunting the children as well. In this alternate timeline, some people are known as Talents, those who have specific abilities that enable them to do seemingly supernatural feats like control dust, become invisible, heal themselves, or be able to harden their skin, among others.

Characters

Main characters 
Marlowe, an 8-year-old Talent who can glow with a supernatural blue light. This light can burn others or heal their injuries.
Charlie Ovid, a 16-year-old Talent from rural Mississippi who can heal himself of any injury, even death. 
Alice Quicke, a private detective working for the Cairndale Institute to find Talents. 
Margaret Harrowgate, a widow and employee of Cairndale Institute who evaluates new Talents. 
Frank Coulton, an employee of the Cairndale Institute who searches for Talents, and Alice's partner. 
Eleanor "Ribs" Ribbon, a young Talent with the power of invisibility.
Jacob Marber, a Talent who has the power of dustworking, or manipulating dust to his will. He has been seduced and corrupted by a mysterious darkness.  
Walter Laster, a strange creature in service of Jacob Marber. 
Dr. Henry Berghast, the head of the Cairndale Institute and the man responsible for finding the Talents. Cold, intelligent, and secretive, he works to find both Marlowe and the drughr. 
Komako Onoe, a young Talent from Tokyo with the power of dustworking, like Jacob Marber.
Oskar Czekowisz, a young Talent from Poland who creates and is accompanied by his flesh-giant companion, Lymenion. 
Abigail Davenshaw, the Talents' tutor at Cairndale Institute. While congenitally blind, she sees more of what happens at Cairndale than most.

Other Characters 
Mr. Bailey, Dr. Berghast's manservant. 
Brynt, a sideshow performer in the circus, and Marlowe's guardian
Ratcliffe Fang, the dangerous kingpin of London's criminal underworld, and sometime ally to Mrs. Harrogate. 
Susan Crowley, a former employee of Cairndale. 
Eliza Grey, a girl fleeing a troubled past who becomes Marlowe's adoptive mother. 
Adra Norn, the leader of a Chicago commune who sheltered a young Alice Quicke.
Mr. Thorpe, Cairndale's ancient glyphic, called "the Spider" by the young Talents. 
Mrs. Ficke, a chandler in Edinburgh with connections to Cairndale.

Creatures 
Talents, humans who have the ability to manipulate dead cells in strange and fantastic ways. 
Litches, corpses reanimated and controlled by dustworkers. They have supernatural strength and speed, and retain little of who they were in life. 
The Drughr, an otherworldly monster bent on finding and consuming Talents. 
Glyphics, onetime Talents who become tied to an orsine. They hold closed the gates to the world of the dead, and can find new Talents in their dreams. 
The Spirit Dead, ribbons of memory drifting through the world behind the orsine. 
The Keywrasse, a mysterious, cat-like creature bound to serve the holder of its weir-bents.
Bonebirds, undead, skeletal messenger birds used for communication by those at Cairndale.

Reception 
Vanessa Armstrong of Tor.com said the "worldbuilding is ... immaculate and impressive in its detail and expansiveness." Lisa Tuttle of The Guardian said the novel is "a complex, often horrific tale ... it is an enthralling read." Margaret Kingsbury of Buzzfeed News said that "character development and backstory drive the novel's sometimes meandering but always intriguing plot forward." Robert Wiersema of The Toronto Star said the book is "an easy match for the quality readers have come to expect from Price's work."

References

2022 fantasy novels
2022 Canadian novels
Canadian fantasy novels
Historical fiction
Flatiron Books books